Gambais is a commune in the Yvelines department in the Île-de-France region in north-central France. The commune is 58 km west from the center of Paris.

See also
Communes of the Yvelines department

References

Communes of Yvelines